Aaron Pierce may refer to:

 Aaron Pierce (24 character), a fictional character on the television series 24
 Aaron Pierce (American football) (born 1969), former professional American football player
Aaron Pierce (racing driver) from Night of NASCAR stars
Aaron Pearce in 2011–12 USHL season